American Record Co may refer to:

 American Record Company
 American Record Corporation ("ARC")